"Broken Arrows" is a 2015 single by Avicii featuring uncredited vocals from Zac Brown of American country music group Zac Brown Band, released on Universal Music. The track appears on his album Stories.

Composition
"Broken Arrows" combines Brown's vocals with "thumping bass and twinkling synth lines".

Like one of Avicii's previous singles, "Hey Brother", "Broken Arrows" is a dance song containing elements of country music. It is written in the key of G major.

Reception
"Broken Arrows" received positive reviews from critics. Chris Parton of Rolling Stone described Brown's vocals as "crystal-clear" and the song's hook as "a cross between a game-show theme song and something from Nintendo's Super Mario Brothers", while Marcus K. Dowling noted similarities between this song and the Kenny Rogers song The Gambler in a review for Insomniac.

Music video
The accompanying music video for the song was directed by Julius Onah. It was released on 23 November 2015. It is inspired by the life of Dick Fosbury, who revolutionized the high jump by introducing a new technique known as the Fosbury Flop.

The music video starts with the caption: "Inspired by a True Story" and is located in Fairmont, a fictitious location in California in 1967, where a struggling athlete lives alone with his daughter in a trailer. The athlete is chastised by his trainer for not achieving enough on the field. The athlete is shown descending into alcoholism and despair. But the athlete is inspired again by his daughter's zeal and acrobatics to invent a new technique in jumping, leading to a gold medal at the 1968 Summer Olympics. Although talking about Fosbury, the video displays however a newspaper clipping, attributing it to a fictional American high jump Olympic athlete named Richard Radomsky in the video. The athlete also has Avicii's signature AV sign tattooed on his back.

The role of Richard Radomsky is played by Joshua Fredric Smith, and his daughter is played by Emily Skinner. Richard Neil plays the coach in the video.

Track listing

Charts

Weekly charts

Year-end charts

Certification

See also
 Zac Brown Band discography

References

2015 singles
2015 songs
Avicii songs
Song recordings produced by Avicii
Songs written by Avicii
Songs written by Rami Yacoub
Songs written by Zac Brown
Songs written by Carl Falk
Songs written by Eric Turner (singer)
Universal Music Group singles